Toll Gate is an unincorporated community in Ritchie County, West Virginia, United States.

The community was named after a tollgate near the original town site.

References

Unincorporated communities in Ritchie County, West Virginia
Unincorporated communities in West Virginia